Niru Thapa (Nepali: निरु थापा) is a Nepali footballer who plays as a midfielder for Nepal Police Club and  captains the Nepal women's national football team.

Career
At the club level, Niru plays for Nepal Police Club of Nepal.

International career
Niru Thap represents Nepal at the international level. She is current nepali national team captain.

International goal

References

Living people
Nepal women's international footballers
Women's association football midfielders
Year of birth missing (living people)
Nepalese women's footballers
South Asian Games silver medalists for Nepal
South Asian Games medalists in football